Queen's College is a private day school for girls aged 11–18 with an adjoining prep school for girls aged 4–11 located in the City of Westminster, London. Founded in 1848 by theologian and social reformer Frederick Denison Maurice along with a committee of patrons. In 1853, it was the first girls' school to be granted a Royal Charter for the furtherance of women's education. Ever since, the college patron has been a British queen; the current patron is Queen Elizabeth II.

The college has a distinctly liberal ethos based upon the principles of F. D. Maurice.

History

In 1845, David Laing, chaplain of the Middlesex Hospital raised funds with a committee of patrons to acquire a building at 47 Harley Street with the intention of creating a home for unemployed governesses.

Laing was keen to develop the institution to provide governesses with an education and certification. In 1847, he acquired the agreement of professors from King's College London to give lectures in the Home. Queen Victoria gave her assent, promise of funds and patronage. In 1847, the first lectures took place, the Committee of Education was established under the chair of F. D. Maurice, and number 45 was purchased. In December of the same year, the first certificates were issued. Meanwhile, it was decided to extend the reach of the education on offer to women who were not governesses.

The establishment of the college was met with criticism by the press, F. D. Maurice was forced to defend the intention of teaching mathematics to women against claims of its 'dangerous' consequences.

The composers William Sterndale Bennett and John Pyke Hullah were among the founding directors.

In the early days of the College, lectures were given to a single classroom of girls ranging from 12 to 20 years of age. The younger pupils were soon to be given their own school at the back of the buildings, which was also open to boys. The Waiting Room became the place where girls would gather and be introduced by the Lady Resident to their chaperones who remained with them throughout their classes and were known as the 'Lady Visitors' (one of them being Henrietta Stanley, Baroness Stanley of Alderley). When the college was separated from the Governesses' Benevolent Institution in 1853, a new Governing Council was established, with the 'Visitor', the Bishop of London as its figurehead, an arrangement which continues to this day. Following the resignation of Maurice in 1853, Richard Chenevix Trench became the first principal and took over as Chair of the Committee of Education.

The college had resisted attempts to become, or merge with, a college of London University. The Lady Resident Eleanor Grove and linguist Rosa Morison had left together in the 1880s because of this and they returned to lead College Hall, London.

The practice of offering lectures from visitors throughout the year is a tradition of the college.

During the Second World War, the college escaped destruction when a bomb exploded on the opposite side of Harley Street. The windows at the front of the building were smashed and plaster work damaged. The college continued to function during the war with classes held in bomb shelters constructed in the main corridor. Evacuation of the pupils to the Lake District and then to Northamptonshire was short-lived.

The college ceased to offer boarding accommodation in the 1980s and Kynaston House was re-modelled from the accommodation to offices, a senior common room and a library.

In 2002, Queen Elizabeth the Queen Mother opened Queen's College Preparatory School at 61 Portland Place.

School organisation
Each student is assigned to a form of approximately 18–22 members. The forms are headed by a tutor and deputy, and take their name from the initials of the tutor. There are two or three forms in a year and each year is under the watch of a year head. The years comprise the three sections of the College, each with a further delegated head.

Preparatory School

College

Ethos

Religious affiliation
The college is Anglican in affiliation, stemming from its foundation under Christian Socialist F. D. Maurice. Half the principals since the College's inception have been vicars or canons of the Anglican Church. Today, the college is associated with the nearby All Souls Church, Langham Place, whose vicar is the school chaplain. Prayers are said daily in the hall (except on Thursday), and the year begins with the reading of a prayer written specially for the College by Maurice. Members of other faiths are welcomed and a weekly Jewish assembly takes place.

Calendar

Terms
The three terms are named Michaelmas, Lent and Summer.

At the end of the Lent Term, Founder's Day is observed, when thanks is given for the founding of the College at All Souls Church, which is also the location of the carol service at the end of the Michaelmas Term.

Annual Gathering
The Summer Term closes with the Annual Gathering, when pupils continue the tradition, begun in 1854, of lining the school corridor dressed all in white, accompanied by the staff in academic dress. The 'Visitor', the Bishop of London, or his representative, is introduced by form tutors and the Principal to every student in the College from Class 1 upwards and selected representatives of Classes 2 and 3. The event is followed by the Principal's report to the governors, parents, staff and pupils on the academic year and an address from the Visitor.

Alumnae

Founded in 1891, the Old Queen's Society exists to connect former pupils with each other and the school. The first Honorary Secretary was Frideswide Kekewich and the first President, Ellen Howard.

Known as Old Queens, alumnae have included many notable women over the school's history, including:
Matilda Ellen Bishop (c. 1858–60), first Principal of Royal Holloway College (1887–1897)
Mary Wardell (c.1851) founder of Convalescent Home for Scarlet Fever
Camilla Croudace, Lady Resident at Queen's College (1881–1906)
Gertrude Bell (1884–86), archaeologist, cartologist, diplomat
Katherine Mansfield (1903–06), poet and author
Rosalie Glynn Grylls, Lady Mander (1919–23), biographer, lecturer, Liberal politician, art collector, who wrote a history of the College
Sofka Skipwith (Princess Sofka Dolgorouk), Russian émigré, Communist, political prisoner, recipient of British Hero of the Holocaust honour
Anne Said (1925–30), artist
Diana Barnato Walker (1928–34), author and aviator
Mary Soames (1940), Chairman, Royal National Theatre Board and daughter of Winston Churchill
Jacqueline du Pré (1959), cellist
Anna Wintour OBE (1960–3), editor-in-chief, Vogue
Jane Asher, actress, entrepreneur, and philanthropist
Hermione Lee (1963–65), biographer and Goldsmith Professor of English Literature, Oxford
Harriet Cass, BBC announcer
Barbara Thompson, musician
Daisy Goodwin (1972–77), BBC television producer
Emma Freud (1973–80), broadcaster, member of the prominent Freud family
Claudia Rosencrantz (1975–79), journalist, Controller of Entertainment, ITV, Commissioner of Who Wants to Be a Millionaire?, X Factor and I'm A Celebrity, Get Me Out of Here!, Director of Programming, Living TV, Director of Television, Virgin Media
Susannah Constantine (1978), journalist, television presenter and fashion guru
Amber Rudd (1979–81), MP
Asma al-Assad, First Lady of Syria
Peaches Geldof, writer, presenter and model
Peggy Cripps, author, philanthropist and socialite

Heads of Queen's College
 style="font-size:100%;"

Principals

 F. D. Maurice (Chair of the Education Committee 1848–53)
 Richard Chenevix Trench (1853–54)
 A. P. Stanley (1863–1872)
 J. LLewelyn Davies (1873–1874)
 Edward Plumptre (1875–1879)
 J. Llewelyn Davies (1879–1886)
 R. Elwyn (1886–1894)
 C. J. Robinson (1895–1898)
 T. W. Sharpe (1898–1903)
 G. C. Bell (1904–1910)
Henry Craik (1911–1915)
 J. F. Kendall (1915–1918)
Joseph Edwards (1919–1931)
G. E. Holloway (1932–1940)
A. M. Kynaston (1940–1963)
Stephanie C. P. Fierz (1964–1983)
P. J. Fleming (1983–1990)
Celia Goodhart (1991–1999)
Margaret Connell (1999–2009)
Frances Ramsey (2009–2017)
Richard Tillett (2017–present)

Deans

 C. G. Nicolay (1848–54)
 E. Plumptre (1854–75)
 Henry Craik (1875–81)
 H. G. Seeley (1881–1909)
 Joseph Edwards (1909–1919)
 R. Bayne (1919–1922)
 T. W. Crafer (1922)

Headmistresses of the School

 Parry (1849–57)
 Hay (1857–1893)
 Palethorpe and Wood (1893–1895)
 Luard (1895–1907)
 Teale (1907–1919)
Position merged with Principal (1919)

Members of staff

Former
Terry Bagg, poet
Dorothea Beale, suffragist and educational reformer
R. C. Trench 
David Bedford, composer
Louisa Bovell-Sturge, pioneering female doctor
Isidore Brasseur, tutor to the Prince of Wales
Émile Cammaerts, Belgian poet
Richard Chenevix Trench, Dean of Westminster
Henry Charles Innes Fripp, Professor of Art
John Pyke Hullah, composer
Janet Kay-Shuttleworth
Elaine Kaye, author
Charles Kingsley, author and social reformer
David Laing, chaplain and secretary of the Governesses' Benevolent Institution
Edward Collett May, music educator
Fiona McIntosh, Olympian and former British number 1 fencer
Tessa Millar, Olympic rower and coach
Edward Plumptre, theologian
Anne Smith, world record holder for running the mile in 1967
Henrietta Maria Stanley
William Sterndale Bennett, composer, Principal of the Royal Academy of Music
Ethel Truman, first woman to achieve a first in physics at London University
Richard Henry Walthew, composer

Secondary Sources
  Grylls, Rosalie Glynn, Queen's College 1848–1948: Founded by Frederick Denison Maurice,London: George Routledge & Sons, 1948
 Kaye, Elaine, A History of Queen's College, London 1848–1972, London: Chatto & Windus, 1972
 Billings, Malcolm, Queen's College: 150 Years and a New Century, London: James & James, 2000

External links
Queen's College website
Old Queen's Society
Queen's College Preparatory School
British history on line: Queen's College, Harley Street
Profile on the Good Schools Guide

Footnotes and References

Educational institutions established in 1848
Private girls' schools in London
Private schools in the City of Westminster
Buildings and structures in the City of Westminster
Member schools of the Girls' Schools Association
1848 establishments in England
1848 in London